Fairview Woods Park (also known as Fairview Woods Wetland Park or Fairview Woods Wetlands Park) is an  public park in Fairview, Oregon, United States.

References

External links

 

Parks in Multnomah County, Oregon